In mathematics, the discrete Fourier transform over a ring generalizes the discrete Fourier transform (DFT), of a function whose values are commonly complex numbers, over an arbitrary ring.

Definition
Let  be any ring, let  be an integer, and let  be a principal nth root of unity, defined by:

 

By convention, the tuple  is said to be in the time domain and the index  is called time. The tuple  is said to be in the frequency domain and the index  is called frequency. This terminology derives from the applications of Fourier transforms in signal processing.

If  is an integral domain (which includes fields), it is sufficient to choose  as a primitive nth root of unity, which replaces the condition (1) by:

 for 

where the sum matches (1). Since  is a primitive root of unity, . Since  is an integral domain, the sum must be zero. ∎

Inverse

The inverse of the discrete Fourier transform is given as:

Proof: Substituting (2) into the right-hand-side of (3), we get

 when  (by (1) with ), and 
 when . ∎

Matrix formulation

Since the discrete Fourier transform is a linear operator, it can be described by matrix multiplication. In matrix notation, the discrete Fourier transform is expressed as follows:

The matrix for this transformation is called the DFT matrix.

Similarly, the matrix notation for the inverse Fourier transform is

Polynomial formulation

Sometimes it is convenient to identify an -tuple  with a formal polynomial 

By writing out the summation in the definition of the discrete Fourier transform (2), we obtain:

The Fourier transform can therefore be seen to relate the coefficients and the values of a polynomial: the coefficients are in the time-domain, and the values are in the frequency domain.

Similarly, the definition of the inverse Fourier transform (3) can be written:

With

this means that 

Special cases

Complex numbers

If  is the field of complex numbers, then the th roots of unity can be visualized as points on the unit circle of the complex plane. In this case, one usually takes 

which yields the usual formula for the complex discrete Fourier transform:

With this normalization, the DFT matrix is then unitary. 
Note that  does not make sense in an arbitrary field.

Finite fields
This in particular ensures that  is invertible, so that the notation  in (3) makes sense. 

Such transform can be carried out efficiently with proper fast algorithms, for example, cyclotomic fast Fourier transform.

Number-theoretic transform
This is a finite field, and primitive th roots of unity exist whenever  divides , so we have  for a positive integer . Specifically, let  be a primitive th root of unity, then an th root of unity  can be found by letting .

when 

 
The number theoretic transform may be meaningful in the ring , even when the modulus  is  not prime, provided a principal root of order  exists. Special cases of the number theoretic transform such as the Fermat Number Transform, used by the Schönhage–Strassen algorithm, or Mersenne Number Transform use a composite modulus.

Discrete weighted transform
The discrete weighted transform (DWT) is a variation on the discrete Fourier transform over arbitrary rings involving weighting the input before transforming it by multiplying elementwise by a weight vector, then weighting the result by another vector. The Irrational base discrete weighted transform is a special case of this.

Properties

Most of the important attributes of the complex DFT, including the inverse transform, the convolution theorem, and most fast Fourier transform (FFT) algorithms, depend only on the property that the kernel of the transform is a principal root of unity. These properties also hold, with identical proofs, over arbitrary rings. In the case of fields, this analogy can be formalized by the field with one element, considering any field with a primitive nth root of unity as an algebra over the extension field 

In particular, the applicability of  fast Fourier transform algorithms to compute the NTT, combined with the convolution theorem, mean that the number-theoretic transform gives an efficient way to compute exact convolutions of integer sequences. While the complex DFT can perform the same task, it is susceptible to round-off error in finite-precision floating point arithmetic; the NTT has no round-off because it deals purely with fixed-size integers that can be exactly represented.

Fast algorithms

For the implementation of a "fast" algorithm (similar to how FFT computes the DFT), it is often desirable that the transform length is also highly composite, e.g., a power of two. However, there are specialized fast Fourier transform algorithms for finite fields, such as Wang and Zhu's algorithm, that are efficient regardless of whether the transform length factors.

See also
Discrete Fourier transform (complex)
Fourier transform on finite groups
Gauss sum
Convolution
Least-squares spectral analysis
Multiplication algorithm

References

External links
 http://www.apfloat.org/ntt.html

Fourier analysis